Kyle Bochniak (born February 5, 1987) is an American mixed martial artist currently competing in the Featherweight division. A professional competitor since 2014, he has competed in the Ultimate Fighting Championship, Professional Fighters League (PFL), and CES MMA.

Background 

Bochniak associated with the wrong crowd when he was growing up where he was drinking excessively and engaging in substance abuse activities. His unhealthy habits led him to drop out of school, and he was in a coma for a week due to overdosing on prescription pills. Bochniak eventually ended up in jail where he found out his father, who left his mother when Bochniak was two, was in the next cell from his. Bochniak realized he did not want to end up like his father, so he made a pledge with the judge with a heartfelt arraignment speech. The judge granted Bochniak five year probation of his offense where he was transferred to Hartford, Connecticut. In Hartford, Bochniak started learning welding and eventually landed a job as a welder. He later stumbled into Broadway Jiu-Jitsu where he started his journey to be a mixed martial artist, which turned his life around.

Mixed martial arts career

Early career
He began training in mixed martial arts in 2010 and starting competing in amateur fights a year later. After compiling a record of 5–1 as an amateur, he started fighting professionally in 2014.

Bochniak compiled an undefeated record of 6–0 on the regional circuit, competing exclusively for CES MMA in nearby Rhode Island. He was signed by the UFC in early 2016.

Ultimate Fighting Championship
Bochniak made his promotional debut on January 17, 2016 as a short notice replacement for Jimy Hettes against Charles Rosa at UFC Fight Night 81. Despite knocking Rosa down in the first round, Bochniak lost the fight via unanimous decision.

Bochniak returned to face Enrique Barzola on August 27, 2016 at UFC on Fox 21. He won the fight via split decision.

Bochniak was expected to face Godofredo Pepey on March 11, 2017 at UFC Fight Night 106. However, both fighters pulled out of the fight during the week leading up to the event citing injuries and the bout was scrapped.

Bochniak faced Jeremy Kennedy on July 22, 2017 at UFC on Fox 25. He lost the fight via unanimous decision.

Bochniak faced Brandon Davis on January 20, 2018 at UFC 220. He won the fight via unanimous decision.

Bochniak faced Zabit Magomedsharipov on April 7, 2018 at UFC 223. He lost the fight by unanimous decision. The fight earned him a Fight of the Night bonus.

Bochniak faced Hakeem Dawodu on December 8, 2018 at UFC 231. He lost the fight via split decision.

Bochniak faced promotional newcomer Sean Woodson on October 18, 2019 at UFC on ESPN: Reyes vs. Weidman. He lost the fight via unanimous decision.

On January 9, 2020, it was announced that Bochniak was released by UFC.

Post-UFC career 
Bochniak was scheduled to face Jonathan Gary in a featherweight bout at CES MMA 61 on April 24, 2020. However, the event was postponed indefinitely due to the COVID-19 pandemic.

Bochniak was then scheduled to fight Tim Teves at Taura MMA 11 on October 30, 2020. However, the bout was cancelled due to an unknown reason.

Bochniak then faced Caio Uruguai at XMMA 1 on January 30, 2021. He won the fight via unanimous decision.

Bochniak was scheduled to face Derek Campos at XMMA 2 on July 30, 2021. However Campos withdrew due to injury and was replaced by Marcus Brimage. He won the fight via unanimous decision.

Bochniak faced Carlton Minus on April 2, 2022 at XMMA 4. He won the bout via split decision.

Professional Fighters League 
Bochniak, replacing Sung Bin Jo, faced Bubba Jenkins on April 28, 2022 at PFL 2. He lost the bout via unanimous decision.

Bochniak faced Chris Wade on June 24, 2022 at PFL 5. He lost the bout via head kick and then ground and pound TKO in the first round.

Championships and accomplishments
Ultimate Fighting Championship
Fight of the Night (One time)

Mixed martial arts record

|-
|Loss
|align=center|11–7
|Chris Wade
|TKO (head kick and punches)
|PFL 5
|
|align=center|1
|align=center|1:10
|Atlanta, Georgia, United States
|
|-
|Loss
|align=center|11–6
|Bubba Jenkins
|Decision (unanimous)
|PFL 2
|
|align=center|3
|align=center|5:00
|Arlington, Texas, United States
|
|-
|Win
|align=center|11–5
| Carlton Minus
| Decision (split)
| XMMA 4: Black Magic
| 
|align=center|3
|align=center|5:00
| New Orleans, Louisiana, United States
|
|-
|Win
|align=center|10–5
|Marcus Brimage
|Decision (unanimous)
|XMMA 2: Saunders vs. Nijem
|
|align=center|3
|align=center|5:00
|Greenville, South Carolina, United States
|   
|-
|Win
|align=center|9–5
|Caio Uruguai
|Decision (unanimous)
|XMMA: Vick vs Fialho
|
|align=center|3
|align=center|5:00
|West Palm Beach, Florida, United States
|
|-
|Loss
|align=center|8–5
|Sean Woodson
|Decision (unanimous)
|UFC on ESPN: Reyes vs. Weidman 
|
|align=center|3
|align=center|5:00
|Boston, Massachusetts, United States
|
|-
|Loss
|align=center|8–4
|Hakeem Dawodu
|Decision (split)
|UFC 231 
|
|align=center|3
|align=center|5:00
|Toronto, Ontario, Canada
|
|- 
|Loss
|align=center|8–3
|Zabit Magomedsharipov
|Decision (unanimous)
|UFC 223
|
|align=center|3
|align=center|5:00
|Brooklyn, New York, United States
|
|-
|Win
|align=center|8–2
|Brandon Davis
||Decision (unanimous)
|UFC 220 
|
|align=center|3
|align=center|5:00
|Boston, Massachusetts, United States
|
|-
|Loss
|align=center| 7–2
|Jeremy Kennedy
||Decision (unanimous)
|UFC on Fox: Weidman vs. Gastelum 
|
|align=center|3
|align=center|5:00
|Uniondale, New York, United States
|
|-
|Win
|align=center| 7–1
|Enrique Barzola
|Decision (split)
|UFC on Fox: Maia vs. Condit
|
|align=center|3
|align=center|5:00
|Vancouver, British Columbia, Canada
|
|-
|Loss
|align=center| 6–1
|Charles Rosa
|Decision (unanimous)
|UFC Fight Night: Dillashaw vs. Cruz
|
|align=center|3
|align=center|5:00
|Boston, Massachusetts, United States
|
|-
|Win
|align=center| 6–0
|Taylor Trahan
|Submission (rear-naked choke)
|CES MMA 32
|
|align=center|1
|align=center|3:58
|Lincoln, Rhode Island, United States
|
|-
|Win
|align=center| 5–0
|Dominic Warr
|KO (punch)
|CES MMA 28
|
|align=center|1
|align=center|1:49
|Lincoln, Rhode Island, United States
|
|-
|Win
|align=center|4–0
|Tom English
|Decision (unanimous)
|CES MMA 27
|
|align=center|3
|align=center|5:00
|Lincoln, Rhode Island, United States
|
|-
|Win
|align=center|3–0
|Ruslan Khubejashvili
|Decision (unanimous)
|CES MMA 26
|
|align=center|3
|align=center|5:00
|Lincoln, Rhode Island, United States
|
|-
|Win
|align=center|2–0
|Marius Enache
|TKO (punches)
|CES MMA 22
|
|align=center|2
|align=center|1:44
|Lincoln, Rhode Island, United States
|
|-
|Win
|align=center|1–0
|Peter Bertucci
|Submission (rear-naked choke)
|CES MMA 21
|
|align=center|1
|align=center|1:05
|Lincoln, Rhode Island, United States
|
|-

See also
 List of male mixed martial artists

References

External links
 
 

Living people
American male mixed martial artists
Featherweight mixed martial artists
Mixed martial artists utilizing Brazilian jiu-jitsu
Mixed martial artists from Massachusetts
Sportspeople from Gloucester, Massachusetts
1987 births
Ultimate Fighting Championship male fighters
American practitioners of Brazilian jiu-jitsu
People from Gloucester, Massachusetts